Neale John Lavis  (11 June 1930 – 6 October 2019) was an Australian equestrian and Olympic champion. He won a team gold medal in eventing at the 1960 Summer Olympics in Rome, and a silver medal in individual eventing. He also participated at the 1964 Tokyo Olympics, but did not win any medals there. He later became involved with a cattle and racehorse stud in Braidwood, which produced Just A Dash, the winner of the 1981 Melbourne Cup, and Strawberry Road, the 1982/83 Racehorse of the Year. After the Rome Olympics, he married Velma; they had four children.

Lavis was inducted into the Sport Australia Hall of Fame in 1989, received a Medal of the Order of Australia in 1999, and received an Australian Sports Medal in 2000.

References

External links

Neale Lavis at the National Museum of Australia, featuring photos and video footage]

1930 births
2019 deaths
Olympic equestrians of Australia
Australian male equestrians
Equestrians at the 1960 Summer Olympics
Equestrians at the 1964 Summer Olympics
Medalists at the 1960 Summer Olympics
Olympic gold medalists for Australia
Olympic silver medalists for Australia
Australian event riders
Olympic medalists in equestrian
Recipients of the Medal of the Order of Australia
Recipients of the Australian Sports Medal
Sport Australia Hall of Fame inductees
20th-century Australian people